Winners of the official Preston North End F.C. Player of the Year Award since its inception in 1967–68:

References

Preston North End F.C.
Preston
Association football player non-biographical articles